Dakshin Raypur is a census town within the jurisdiction of the Nodakhali police station in the Budge Budge II CD block in the Alipore Sadar subdivision of the South 24 Parganas district in the Indian state of West Bengal.

Geography

Area overview
Alipore Sadar subdivision is the most urbanized part of the South 24 Parganas district. 59.85% of the population lives in urban areas and 40.15% lives in the rural areas. In the northern portion of the subdivision (shown in the map alongside) there are 21 census towns. The entire district is situated in the Ganges Delta and the subdivision, on the east bank of the Hooghly River, is an alluvial stretch, with industrial development.

Note: The map alongside presents some of the notable locations in the subdivision. All places marked in the map are linked in the larger full screen map.

Location

Bowali, Chak Kashipur, Chak Alampur, Dakshin Raypur and Poali form a cluster of census towns, as per the map of the Budge Budge II CD block on page 181 of the District Census Handbook 2011 for the South 24 Parganas.

Demographics
According to the 2011 Census of India, Dakshin Raypur had a total population of 14,076, of which 7,245 (51%) were males and 6,831 (49%) were females. There were 1,488 people in the age range of 0 to 6 years. The total number of literate people was 9,608 (76.33% of the population over 6 years).

Infrastructure
According to the District Census Handbook 2011, Dakshin Raypur covered an area of 4.422 km2.  Among the civic amenities, the water supply involved over-head tank. It had 1,341 domestic electric connections. Among the educational facilities it had were 7 primary schools and 1 secondary school. Three important commodities it produced were papad, pottery and zari wok.

Economy

Tourism
There is a three-storeyed Bhagirathi Inspection Bungalow of the Public Health Engineering Department built in 2003, initially for departmental people visiting the place in connection with work in the nearby water-treatment plant, but later partially open to the general public, with advance reservation from 33 & 33/1 Chetla Central Road, Kolkata. One gets a remarkable view of the wide Hooghly from the first floor balcony. Sunset at Dakshin Raypur is brilliant.

Transport
A short stretch of local roads link Dakshin Raypur to the Budge Budge Trunk Road.

Budge Budge railway station is located nearby.

Education
Raipur Sri Sri Ramakrishna Amrita Vidyalaya is a Bengali-medium coeducational institution established in 1926. It has facilities for teaching from class VI to class XII.

Healthcare
Lakshmibala Dutta Rural Hospital, with 30 beds, at Bakrahat, is the major government medical facility in the Budge Budge II CD block.

References

Cities and towns in South 24 Parganas district
Neighbourhoods in Kolkata
Kolkata Metropolitan Area